The Truett McConnell Bears are the athletic teams that represent Truett McConnell University, located in Cleveland, Georgia, in intercollegiate sports as a member of the National Association of Intercollegiate Athletics (NAIA), primarily competing in the Appalachian Athletic Conference (AAC) since the 2013–14 academic year. The Bears previously competed in the Southern States Athletic Conference (SSAC; formerly known as Georgia–Alabama–Carolina Conference (GACC) until after the 2003–04 school year) from 2010–11 to 2012–13; as well as an NAIA Independent within the Association of Independent Institutions (AII) during the 2009–10 school year (when the school joined the NAIA).

Varsity teams
TMU competes in 22 intercollegiate varsity sports: Men's sports include baseball, basketball, cross country, golf, soccer, tennis, track & field, volleyball and wrestling; while women's sports include basketball, beach volleyball, cross country, golf, lacrosse, soccer, softball, tennis, track & field and volleyball; and life sports inc;ude competitive gaming, cycling and shooting sports.

Nickname
The initial nickname of TMU's athletic teams, "The Mountaineers," was changed to "Danes" in 1965, and is now the "Bears".

Notable people
Mitchell Wiggins, NBA player and father of NBA player Andrew Wiggins, played basketball at Truett McConnell from 1978 to 1979

References

External links